Hervé Guégan is a French former professional footballer who played as a defensive midfielder.

References

External links
Hervé Guégan profile at chamoisfc79.fr

Living people
French footballers
Association football midfielders
Angers SCO players
En Avant Guingamp players
Stade Brestois 29 players
Chamois Niortais F.C. players
FC Lorient players
Ligue 1 players
Quimper Kerfeunteun F.C. players
Ligue 2 players
Sportspeople from Finistère
Footballers from Brittany
Year of birth missing (living people)
People from Quimperlé
Paris Saint-Germain F.C. non-playing staff
Association football coaches